The following television stations broadcast on Digital television digital channel 7 in the United States:

 K07BW-D in Westcliffe, Colorado, on virtual channel 11, which rebroadcasts KKTV
 K07CG-D in Toquerville, Utah, on virtual channel 5, which rebroadcasts KSL-TV
 K07CH-D in Plains & Paradise, Montana, on virtual channel 4, which rebroadcasts KXLY-TV
 K07DI-D in Hinsdale, Montana, on virtual channel 8, which rebroadcasts KUMV-TV
 K07DU-D in Ely & McGill, Nevada, on virtual channel 4, which rebroadcasts KTVX
 K07DV-D in Ruth, Nevada, on virtual channel 4, which rebroadcasts KTVX
 K07ED-D in Enterprise, Utah, on virtual channel 5, which rebroadcasts KSL-TV
 K07EJ-D in Townsend, Montana, on virtual channel 21, which rebroadcasts KHBB-LD
 K07EN-D in Woodsbay, Lakeside, Montana, on virtual channel 23, which rebroadcasts KTMF
 K07EQ-D in Ekalaka, Montana, on virtual channel 11, which rebroadcasts KQME
 K07FL-D in Thompson Falls, Montana, on virtual channel 8, which rebroadcasts KPAX-TV
 K07GI-D in Prospect, Oregon, on virtual channel 10, which rebroadcasts KTVL
 K07GJ-D in Hoopa, California, on virtual channel 3, which rebroadcasts KIEM-TV
 K07GQ-D in Cedar City, Utah, on virtual channel 7, which rebroadcasts KUED
 K07HM-D in Big Piney, etc., Wyoming, on virtual channel 2, which rebroadcasts KTWO-TV
 K07HS-D in Williams, Oregon, on virtual channel 5, which rebroadcasts KOBI
 K07IB-D in Whitewater, Montana, on virtual channel 4, which rebroadcasts KHMT
 K07IC-D in Malta, Montana, on virtual channel 5, which rebroadcasts KFBB-TV
 K07IT-D in West Glacier, etc., Montana, on virtual channel 42, which rebroadcasts KTMF
 K07JG-D in Glasgow, Montana, on virtual channel 5, which rebroadcasts KFBB-TV
 K07JO-D in Chelan Butte, Washington, on virtual channel 7, which rebroadcasts KSPS-TV
 K07JT-D in Brookings, Oregon, on virtual channel 5, which rebroadcasts KOBI
 K07KF-D in Thomasville, Colorado, on virtual channel 5, which rebroadcasts KREX-TV
 K07NL-D in Juliaetta, Idaho, on virtual channel 2, which rebroadcasts KREM
 K07NR-D in Lakeview, etc., Oregon, on virtual channel 2, which rebroadcasts KOTI
 K07NU-D in White Sulphur Springs, Montana, on virtual channel 8, which rebroadcasts KULR-TV
 K07OC-D in Polaris, Montana, on virtual channel 4, which rebroadcasts KXLF-TV
 K07OJ-D in Snowflake, Arizona, on virtual channel 10, which rebroadcasts KSAZ-TV
 K07OL-D in Kipnuk, Alaska, on virtual channel 7, which rebroadcasts K03GL-D
 K07PA-D in Manitou Springs, Colorado, on virtual channel 8, which rebroadcasts KTSC
 K07PB-D in Thayne, etc., Wyoming, on virtual channel 8, which rebroadcasts KIFI-TV
 K07PF-D in Homer, Alaska, on virtual channel 7, which rebroadcasts KAKM
 K07PG-D in Seward, Alaska
 K07PZ-D in Cave Junction, Oregon, on virtual channel 5, which rebroadcasts KOBI
 K07QC-D in Driggs, Idaho, on virtual channel 3, which rebroadcasts KIDK
 K07QD-D in Hooper Bay, Alaska, on virtual channel 7, which rebroadcasts K03GL-D
 K07QX-D in Golovin, Alaska, on virtual channel 7, which rebroadcasts K03GL-D
 K07RB-D in Tanana, Alaska, on virtual channel 7, which rebroadcasts K03GL-D
 K07RD-D in Savoonga, Alaska, on virtual channel 7, which rebroadcasts K03GL-D
 K07RJ-D in Holy Cross, Alaska, on virtual channel 7, which rebroadcasts K03GL-D
 K07RK-D in St. Marys, Alaska
 K07RU-D in Dot Lake, Alaska
 K07RY-D in Chignik, Alaska, on virtual channel 7, which rebroadcasts K03GL-D
 K07SS-D in Angoon, Alaska, on virtual channel 7, which rebroadcasts K03GL-D
 K07ST-D in Women's Bay, Alaska
 K07TH-D in Lime Village, Alaska
 K07TK-D in Marshall, Alaska, on virtual channel 7, which rebroadcasts K03GL-D
 K07UY-D in Cortez, Colorado, on virtual channel 7
 K07VA-D in Jordan, Montana, on virtual channel 5, which rebroadcasts KFBB-TV
 K07VY-D in The Dalles, Oregon, on virtual channel 6, which rebroadcasts KOIN
 K07WJ-D in Colstrip, Montana, on virtual channel 6, which rebroadcasts KSVI
 K07WP-D in Roundup, Montana, on virtual channel 6, which rebroadcasts KSVI
 K07XL-D in Mountain Home, Arkansas, on virtual channel 26, which rebroadcasts K26GS-D
 K07XM-D in Mink Creek, Idaho, on virtual channel 13, which rebroadcasts KSTU
 K07YJ-D in Bullhead City, Arizona, on virtual channel 10, which rebroadcasts KSAZ-TV
 K07ZE-D in Rural Juab, etc., Utah, on virtual channel 8, which rebroadcasts KTTA-LD
 K07ZG-D in Powderhorn Valley, Colorado, on virtual channel 8, which rebroadcasts KTSC
 K07ZL-D in Leavenworth, Washington, on virtual channel 2, which rebroadcasts KREM
 K07ZP-D in Bull Lake Valley, Montana, on virtual channel 2, which rebroadcasts KREM
 K07ZQ-D in Georgetown, Idaho, on virtual channel 6, which rebroadcasts KPVI-DT
 K07ZR-D in Harlowton & Shawmut, Montana, on virtual channel 6, which rebroadcasts KSVI
 K07ZU-D in Blanding, Monticello, Utah
 K07ZV-D in Sigurd & Salina, Utah, on virtual channel 2, which rebroadcasts KUTV
 K07ZW-D in Marysvale, Utah, on virtual channel 2, which rebroadcasts KUTV
 K07ZX-D in Woodland & Kamas, Utah, on virtual channel 2, which rebroadcasts KUTV
 K07ZY-D in Beaver, etc., Utah, on virtual channel 7, which rebroadcasts KUED
 K07ZZ-D in East Price, Utah, on virtual channel 2, which rebroadcasts KUTV
 K07AAA-D in Helper, Utah, on virtual channel 2, which rebroadcasts KUTV
 K07AAB-D in Roosevelt, etc., Utah, on virtual channel 2, which rebroadcasts KUTV
 K07AAD-D in Fort Worth, Texas, on virtual channel 7
 K07AAF-D in Corsicana, Texas
 K07AAI-D in Reno, Nevada
 K07AAN-D in Santa Maria, California
 K48EK-D in Long Valley Junction, Utah, on virtual channel 2, which rebroadcasts KUTV
 KABC-TV in Los Angeles, California, on virtual channel 7
 KAII-TV in Wailuku, Hawaii, on virtual channel 7
 KAIL in Fresno, California, on virtual channel 7
 KAUU in Anchorage, Alaska, on virtual channel 5
 KAZT-TV in Prescott, Arizona, on virtual channel 7
 KBNZ-LD in Bend, Oregon, on virtual channel 7
 KBSH-DT in Hays, Kansas, on virtual channel 7
 KDHU-LD in Houston, Texas, on virtual channel 50
 KETS in Little Rock, Arkansas, on virtual channel 2
 KGWL-TV in Lander, Wyoming, on virtual channel 5
 KHQA-TV in Hannibal, Missouri, on virtual channel 7, which will move to channel 22
 KHXL-LD in Huntsville, Texas, on virtual channel 7
 KJJC-LD in Helena, Montana, on virtual channel 7, which rebroadcasts KJJC-TV
 KJRR in Jamestown, North Dakota, on virtual channel 7
 KJUN-CD in Morgan City, Louisiana, on virtual channel 30
 KLAS-TV in Las Vegas, Nevada, on virtual channel 8
 KLML in Grand Junction, Colorado, on virtual channel 20
 KLTV in Tyler, Texas, on virtual channel 7
 KMGH-TV in Denver, Colorado, on virtual channel 7
 KMNE-TV in Bassett, Nebraska, on virtual channel 7
 KMNF-LD in Mankato, Minnesota, on virtual channel 7
 KNEP in Scottsbluff, Nebraska, on virtual channel 4
 KOAC-TV in Corvallis, Oregon, on virtual channel 7
 KOAM-TV in Pittsburg, Kansas, on virtual channel 7
 KOAT-TV in Albuquerque, New Mexico, on virtual channel 7
 KOCO-TV in Oklahoma City, Oklahoma, on virtual channel 5
 KOSA-TV in Odessa, Texas, on virtual channel 7
 KOTA-TV in Rapid City, South Dakota, on virtual channel 3
 KOTR-LD in Monterey, California, on virtual channel 11
 KPAX-TV in Missoula, Montana, on virtual channel 8
 KPLC in Lake Charles, Louisiana, on virtual channel 7
 KQCD-TV in Dickinson, North Dakota, on virtual channel 7
 KQTV in St. Joseph, Missouri, on virtual channel 2
 KRCA in Riverside, California, which uses KABC-TV's spectrum, on virtual channel 62
 KRCR-TV in Redding, California, on virtual channel 7
 KRON-TV in San Francisco, California, on virtual channel 4
 KRTV in Great Falls, Montana, on virtual channel 3
 KSPS-TV in Spokane, Washington, on virtual channel 7
 KTBC in Austin, Texas, on virtual channel 7
 KTNL-TV in Sitka, Alaska, on virtual channel 7
 KTTW in Sioux Falls, South Dakota, on virtual channel 7
 KTVB in Boise, Idaho, on virtual channel 7
 KWWL in Waterloo, Iowa, on virtual channel 7
 KZTC-LD in San Diego, California, on virtual channel 7
 W07DC-D in Allentown/Bethlehem, Pennsylvania, on virtual channel 16, which rebroadcasts WNEP-TV
 W07DD-D in Champaign, Illinois, on virtual channel 7
 W07DS-D in Burnsville, North Carolina, on virtual channel 4, which rebroadcasts WYFF
 W07DT-D in Tryon & Columbus, North Carolina, on virtual channel 4, which rebroadcasts WYFF
 WABC-TV in New York, New York, on virtual channel 7
 WACS-TV in Dawson, Georgia, on virtual channel 25
 WACX in Leesburg, Florida, on virtual channel 55
 WBBZ-TV in Springville, New York, on virtual channel 67
 WCDN-LD in Cleveland, Ohio, on virtual channel 53
 WCHU-LD in Oakwood Hills, Illinois, on virtual channel 59, which rebroadcasts WAOE
 WDAM-TV in Laurel, Mississippi, on virtual channel 7
 WFGC in Palm Beach, Florida, on virtual channel 61
 WGTV in Athens, Georgia, on virtual channel 8
 WHFL-CD in Goldsboro, North Carolina, on virtual channel 43
 WHMB-TV in Indianapolis, Indiana, on virtual channel 40
 WICZ-TV in Binghamton, New York, on virtual channel 40
 WJBK in Detroit, Michigan, on virtual channel 2
 WJLA-TV in Washington, D.C., on virtual channel 7
 WKIN-CD in Weber County, Virginia/Kingsport, Tennessee, on virtual channel 36, which rebroadcasts WAPK-CD
 WKNX-TV in Knoxville, Tennessee, on virtual channel 7
 WLJC-TV in Beattyville, Kentucky, on virtual channel 65
 WNPT in Nashville, Tennessee, on virtual channel 8
 WNYA in Pittsfield, Massachusetts, on virtual channel 51
 WOLO-TV in Columbia, South Carolina, on virtual channel 25
 WOOD-TV in Grand Rapids, Michigan, on virtual channel 8
 WPRI-TV in Providence, Rhode Island, on virtual channel 12
 WSAW-TV in Wausau, Wisconsin, on virtual channel 7
 WSET-TV in Lynchburg, Virginia, on virtual channel 13
 WSTE-DT in Ponce, Puerto Rico, on virtual channel 7
 WTPC-TV in Virginia Beach, Virginia, on virtual channel 21
 WTRF-TV in Wheeling, West Virginia, on virtual channel 7
 WVII-TV in Bangor, Maine, on virtual channel 7
 WVTM-TV in Birmingham, Alabama, on virtual channel 13
 WVNY in Burlington, Vermont, on virtual channel 22
 WXGA-TV in Waycross, Georgia, on virtual channel 8

The following stations, which are no longer licensed, formerly broadcast on digital channel 7:
 K07BE-D in Gunnison, Colorado
 K07GD-D in Glenwood Springs, Colorado
 K07IA-D in Oakland, Oregon
 K07JS-D in North Bend, Oregon
 K07QU-D in Shaktoolik, Alaska
 K07QV-D in Hoonah, Alaska
 K07RC-D in Fort Yukon, Alaska
 K07RZ-D in Crooked Creek, Alaska
 K07VH-D in Sargents, Colorado
 K07ZB-D in Mendenhall Valley, Alaska
 K07ZC-D in Ellensburg/Kittitas, Washington
 KCCO-TV in Alexandria, Minnesota
 KFYF in Fairbanks, Alaska
 KJCW in Sheridan, Wyoming
 KWNV in Winnemucca, Nevada
 W07BP-D in Ocala, Florida
 W07DN-D in Wardensville, etc., West Virginia
 W07DR-D in Manchester, New Hampshire
 WDQB-LD in Wilmington, North Carolina
 WNGA-LD in Salisbury, Maryland

References

07 digital